Tributyltin chloride is an organotin compound with the formula (C4H9)3SnCl.  It is a colorless liquid that is soluble in organic solvents.

Preparation and reactions
The compound is prepared by a redistribution reaction by combining stannic chloride and tetrabutyltin:
3 (C4H9)4Sn  +   SnCl4   →  4 (C4H9)3SnCl
Tributyltin chloride hydrolyzes to the oxide [(C4H9)3Sn]2O

Tributyltin chloride is used as a precursor to other organotin compounds and reagents, such as tributyltin hydride.

Literature

Chlorides
Metal halides
Organotin compounds
Foul-smelling chemicals
Tin(IV) compounds
Butyl compounds